Helenactyna is a genus of  cribellate araneomorph spiders in the family Dictynidae, and was first described by Pierre L.G. Benoit in 1977.  it contains only two species, both from Saint Helena: H. crucifera and H. vicina.

References

Araneomorphae genera
Dictynidae
Spiders of Africa